The East Klang Valley Expressway, EKVE  or Kuala Lumpur Outer Ring Road (KLORR) is a new expressway under construction in Klang Valley, Malaysia. The  expressway will connect Ukay Perdana in Ampang, Selangor and Bandar Sungai Long in Kajang. This expressway is part of the Kuala Lumpur Outer Ring Road (KLORR). The construction of the expressway was started on 1 September 2015. Once completed, the expressway will benefit 140,000 motorists per day.

The phase 1 of the expressway stretches 24.1 km and costs MYR 1.55 billion.

Route background
The expressways for phase 1 starts from Kuala Lumpur Middle Ring Road 2 in Ukay Perdana (north), Ulu Klang, via Ampang, Hulu Langat, Bandar Mahkota Cheras ending at Kajang Dispersal Link in Sungai Long (south). It is built to link areas in southern Greater Kuala Lumpur like Seremban, Kajang, Semenyih and Putrajaya to the  East Coast Expressway (and vice versa) that is a gateway to the east coast areas of Peninsular Malaysia while bypasssing heavy traffic areas in the Klang Valley.

History
EKVE Sdn Bhd (a member of Ahmad Zaki Resources Berhad (AZRB)), the developer of the expressway, is expected to begin construction of the RM 1.55 billion project in September 2015. Originally the project is expected to take 4 years to complete, but a series of delays in the project meant that, in October 2020, the completion target were revised to be completed by the third quarter of 2021.

As of November 2021, the project is 94.48% completed, and were expected to be completed by the end of 2022. However due to several lawsuit against EKVE Sdn Bhd involving a piece of land at Beverly Heights, the completion of the highway were delayed to 2023 as per announced by then Minister of Works, Fadillah Yusof on October 2022. The opening of the highway also will be done in stages, with the Sungai Long-Ampang stretch will be the first stage to be opened in the second quarter of 2023.

The many delays of EKVE means by the time of its completion, it will have to compete with several alternatives to its route that have been completed earlier, such as SUKE (completed September 2022) and MRT Putrajaya Line (completed March 2023).

Construction of EKVE is attributed as the cause of several flash floods and mud floods in the areas the highway were built, including the 2021–2022 Malaysian floods in the Ampang/Hulu Langat area.

Features
 The expressway will connect Ukay Perdana in Ulu Klang and Bandar Sungai Long in Kajang, has interchanges also at Lembah Jaya in Ampang
 Length extended to 39.5 km to avoid sensitive areas due to public protests
 New alignment avoids the Klang Gates Quartz Ridge at Melawati 
 Including a 200 m tunnel
 Costs RM 2.2 billion and has six toll plazas

Controversies
 The phase 1 of the project is heavily criticized due to de-gazetting of 106.6 ha of the Ampang Forest Reserve, a critical source of water for Klang Valley.
 The phase 2 of the project (from Ukay Perdana to the Kuala Lumpur–Karak Expressway) would have cut through the Ulu Gombak forest reserve. The phase 2 has not been approved due to environmental concerns.

List of Interchanges

References

External links
 EKVE website
 AZRB website

Expressways in Malaysia
Proposed roads in Malaysia